Charig is a surname. Notable people with the name include:

Alan J. Charig (1927–1997), English paleontologist and writer
Mark Charig (born 1944), British trumpeter and cornetist
Phil Charig (1902–1960), American musical theatre composer and lyricist

See also
Chari (surname)